The 238th Aviation Regiment is an aviation regiment of the U.S. Army.

Structure
 2nd Battalion (General Support) (IN ARNG)
 Afghanistan 2017 - 2018
 Company A (CO ARNG)
 Company B (CH-47)
 Detachment 1 "River City Hookers" at Army Aviation Support Facility #2, Donaldson Center Airport (SC ARNG)
 Company C (UH-60) "Hoosier Dustoff"
 Middle East 2020
 Company D
 Detachment 6 (AR ARNG)
 Company E
 Detachment 1 (CO ARNG)
 Detachment 6 (AR ARNG)
 Company F (UH-60)
 Detachment 1 (AR ARNG)
 Company G (UH-60L) (LA ARNG)
 Company Flag (ASMP & FSMP) "Bayou Dustoff" (LA ARNG)
 Detachment 1 at Army Aviation Support Facility, Reno Stead Airport (NV ARNG)
 Detachment 2 "Phoenix Dustoff" (AZ ARNG)
 3rd Battalion (General Support) (MI ARNG)
 Headquarters Company
Detachment 1 (DE ARNG)
Company A "Misfits" (DE ARNG) 
Company B 
 Detachment 1 at Selfridge (MI ARNG)
 Company C (NH ARNG)
 Detachment 1 at Grand Ledge (MI ARNG)
 Company D at Grand Ledge (MI ARNG)
Detachment 1 (DE ARNG)
 Company E at Grand Ledge (MI ARNG)
Detachment 1 (DE ARNG)

References

238
Aviation